The International Conference of Rome for the Social Defense Against Anarchists was held between November 24 and December 21, 1898 following the assassination of Empress Elisabeth of Austria by Luigi Lucheni on the promenade of Lake Geneva on September 10, 1898. Fifty-four delegates attended from 21 countries. Every participating government agreed to set up special organizations for the surveillance of those suspected of anarchism, defined as "any act that used violent means to destroy the organization of society."

The other resolutions drafted in the final protocol included the introduction of legislation in the participating governments to prohibit the illegitimate possession and use of explosives, membership in anarchist organizations, the distribution of anarchist propaganda, and the rendering of assistance to anarchists. It was also agreed that governments should try to limit press coverage of anarchist activities, and that the death penalty should be mandatory punishment for all assassinations of heads of state.

The authorities used the opportunity to organize an international system of exchange among the national police agencies, using the portrait parlé method of criminal identification. This was developed from the bertillonage system invented by Alphonse Bertillon and involved the classification of criminal suspects on the basis of numerically expressed measurements of parts of their head and body.

A further anti-anarchist conference was held in Saint Petersburg in March 1904. This conference was called after an anarchist assassinated William McKinley, the President of the United States, on September 14, 1901. Ten governments sent representatives, including Germany, Austria-Hungary, and Denmark.

Here the Secret Protocol for the International War on Anarchism was drawn up. Portugal and Spain were to subsequently agree to this, while France and Great Britain decided not sign the St. Petersburg Protocol, but did express a willingness to help other states on police matters relating to anarchism. The United States government neither participated in the St. Petersburg meeting nor agreed to follow its provisions. However President Theodore Roosevelt, McKinley's successor, had called for an international treatise to combat anarchism.

See also
Anarchism and violence
Propaganda of the deed, the doctrine of the use of violence by anarchists around this time period

References

 Beugniet, Thomas, "La conférence anti-anarchiste de Rome (1898)" : et les débuts d'une coopération internationale contre le terrorisme de la fin du XIXe siècle à la Première Guerre mondiale, mémoire, (dir.) Stanislas Jeannesson, Nantes, Université de Nantes, 2016, 316 p.
 Deflem, Mathieu. 2005a. International Police Cooperation --History of. pp. 795–798 in The Encyclopedia of Criminology, edited by Richard A. Wright and J. Mitchell Miller. New York: Routledge
 Deflem, Mathieu. 2005b. "Wild Beasts Without Nationality": The Uncertain Origins of Interpol, 1898-1910." Pp. 275-285 in The Handbook of Transnational Crime and Justice, edited by Philip Reichel. Thousand Oaks, CA: Sage Publications. 

History of anarchism
Anti-anarchism
Counterterrorism